The Strand Theatre on Hill Avenue in Grafton, North Dakota, United States, was built in 1946.  It reflects Moderne architecture.  It has also been known as the New Strand, as the Strand Twin Theatre, as the Deluxe Theatre, and as the Strand Deluxe Theater.  It was listed on the National Register of Historic Places (NRHP) in 2004.  According to its NRHP nomination form, the theater is known for a "tradition of community service" and "implementation of innovative entertainment and marketing ideas," including regular showings of foreign films.

References

Moderne architecture in North Dakota
Theatres completed in 1946
Theatres on the National Register of Historic Places in North Dakota
1946 establishments in North Dakota
National Register of Historic Places in Walsh County, North Dakota
Grafton, North Dakota